

Population 
The population that year was 5,522,403. There was a total of 135,625 births in 1910. The death total was 77,212. 8,142 legal immigrations were recorded. 27,816 emigrations happened that year.

Incumbents
 Monarch – Gustaf V
 Prime Minister - Arvid Lindman

Events
 The Swedish Municipal Workers' Union is founded.
 Foundation of the Karolinska förbundet. 
 Svenska Vitterhetssamfundet is founded.

Births

 18 January – Roland Svensson,  artist  (died 2003)
 15 october - Torbjörn Caspersson, biologist  (died 1997)

Deaths
 February 18 – Johanna Sundberg, ballerina (born 1828)
 9 March – Fredrik von Otter, politician (born 1833) 
 17 November - Sigrid Sparre, courtier (born 1825)
 Maria Ribbing, schoolteacher and philanthropist (born 1842)

References

External links

 
Years of the 20th century in Sweden
Sweden